Aboon Thomas Mar Eusebius (born Thomas Naickamparampil June 6, 1961) is serving as the first bishop of the Syro-Malankara Catholic Eparchy in the United States. He was serving as the first exarch of the Malankara Syrian Catholic Exarchate since his enthronement on October 3, 2010.  On August 5, 2017, Baselios Cardinal Cleemis, the Major Archbishop-Catholicos of the Malankara Catholic Church, announced that Eusebius would be the first Bishop of the new Malankara Diocese of Parassala, India.

Biography

Early life and education
Thomas Naickamparampil was born in Mylapra in the state of Kerala. His home parish is Sacred Heart Malankara Catholic Church, Mylapra.

He obtained a master's degree in Philosophy from Jnana Deepa Vidyapeeth, Pune and Doctorate in Philosophy from the Pontifical Gregorian University, Rome. The Gregorian University published his doctoral thesis. He speaks Malayalam, English, German, Italian and Hindi and knows Syriac, Greek and French.

Ordination and ministry
Eusebius was ordained priest for Syro-Malankara Catholic Church on December 29, 1986. After his ordination he held the following positions: assistant pastor and pastor in several communities, then dean and professor of philosophy at St. Mary's Malankara Major Seminary.

He served as Secretary-General of the Archbishop of the Syro-Malankara, Public Relations Officer, Coordinator for Interreligious Dialogue and Secretary of the council of priests. He was also the director of Sarvodaya Vidyalaya, a school in Trivandrum.

Syro-Malankara Catholic Exarch
Eusebius was appointed as the first exarch of the Syro-Malankara Catholic Exarchate in the United States on July 14, 2010 and at the same time Titular Bishop of Lares. He is concurrently the priest apostolic visitator for Syro-Malankara Catholics in Canada and Europe. As such he is the papal representative who is charged with familiarising himself with the situation of a given community and reporting on its status to the Vatican. Eusebius received the tonsuring to remban (rabban in syriac) on Saturday, September 11, 2010 at Sacred Heart Malankara Catholic Church, Mylapra.

He was ordained bishop on September 21, 2010 at St. Mary's Malankara Syrian Catholic Cathedral, Trivandrum and his installation ceremony was on October 3, 2010 at Kellenberg Memorial High School, Uniondale, New York, United States.

Apostolic Exarchate
An apostolic exarchate in the Eastern Catholic Church is the equivalent of an apostolic vicariate in the Latin church - is created for the pastoral care of Catholics in an area outside the territory of the Eastern Catholic Church to which they belong.

In North America, there are 16 Syro-Malankara parishes and 15 churches  serving about 10,000 Syro-Malankara Faithful. There are 30 priests and 34 women religious who minister to them. Syro-Malankara Catholics first began to migrate to the United States in the 1960s and 1970s, but did not have their own Congregations until 1984, settling first in the New York and Philadelphia Metropolitan Areas.

Published works
 THROUGH SELF-DISCOVERY TO SELF-TRANSCENDENCE. A Study of Cognitional Self-Appropriation in Bernard Lonergan ( / 9788876527500)

See also 
 

 East Syriac Rite
 Syriac Christianity
 Terms for Syriac Christians
 West Syriac Rite
 Catholic Church hierarchy
 Catholic Church in the United States
 Historical list of the Catholic bishops of the United States
 List of Catholic bishops of the United States
 Lists of patriarchs, archbishops, and bishops

References

External links
Syro-Malankara Catholic Eparchy of the United States of America and Canada Official Website
Bishop Thomas Eusebius Naickamparampil

Episcopal succession

Living people
1961 births
Pontifical Gregorian University alumni
Syro-Malankara bishops
Christian clergy from Kerala
Eastern Catholic bishops in the United States
People from Pathanamthitta district
Indian Eastern Catholic bishops